Calymma is a monotypic moth genus of the family Erebidae erected by Jacob Hübner in 1823. Its single species, Calymma communimacula, was first described by Michael Denis and Ignaz Schiffermüller in 1775. It is found in central and southern Europe and from Turkey to Transcaucasia and the Middle East.

The wingspan is 18–24 mm. Adults are on wing from July to August.

The larvae live on trees, but do not feed on plant material, but suck dry Coccoidea (scale insects) and use the empty hulls as a protective shelter. Pupation takes place in a spinning on the tree trunk.

Taxonomy
The genus has previously been classified in the subfamily Eublemminae of Erebidae or the subfamily Acontiinae of the family Noctuidae.

References

External links

Moths and Butterflies of Europe and North Africa
Lepiforum e.V.

Moths described in 1775
Boletobiinae
Moths of Europe
Moths of Asia
Taxa named by Michael Denis
Taxa named by Ignaz Schiffermüller
Monotypic moth genera